Sri Sai P.G. College is in Nagar Kurnool, Mahbubnagar district, Telangana, India in 2007. Presently this college is offering MBA, MCA and B.Ed courses.  Prof.M. Govind Ram Reddy is a director and Dr. P. Rajeshwar Reddy is a chairman.

See also 
Education in India
Literacy in India
List of institutions of higher education in Telangana

References

External links
https://srisai.ac.in/ Official website 

Universities and colleges in Telangana
Mahbubnagar district
2007 establishments in Andhra Pradesh
Educational institutions established in 2007